Isara nigra is a species of sea snail, a marine gastropod mollusk, in the family Mitridae, the miters or miter snails.

Description
The length of the shell attains 20 mm.

Distribution
This marine species occurs off Papua New Guinea.

References

 Quoy, H. E. Th. & Gaimard, P., 1833 Mollusques. Zoologie. In Voyage de découvertes de l'Astrolabe, exécuté par ordre du Roi, pendant les années 1826-1827-1828-1829, sous le commandement de M. J. Dumont d'Urville, vol. 2(2), p. 321-686

External links
Gmelin J.F. (1791). Vermes. In: Gmelin J.F. (Ed.) Caroli a Linnaei Systema Naturae per Regna Tria Naturae, Ed. 13. Tome 1(6). G.E. Beer, Lipsiae [Leipzig. pp. 3021-3910]
 Fedosov A., Puillandre N., Herrmann M., Kantor Yu., Oliverio M., Dgebuadze P., Modica M.V. & Bouchet P. (2018). The collapse of Mitra: molecular systematics and morphology of the Mitridae (Gastropoda: Neogastropoda). Zoological Journal of the Linnean Society. 183(2): 253-337

nigra
Gastropods described in 1791